Pyrophytes are plants which have adapted to tolerate fire.

Fire acts favourably for some species. "Passive pyrophytes" resist the effects of fire, particularly when it passes over quickly, and hence can out-compete less resistant plants, which are damaged. "Active pyrophytes" have a similar competing advantage to passive pyrophytes, but they also contain volatile oils and hence encourage the incidence of fires which are beneficial to them. "Pyrophile" plants are plants which require fire in order to complete their cycle of reproduction.

Passive pyrophytes 

These resist fire with adaptations including thick bark, tissue with high moisture content, or underground storage structures. Examples include:
 Longleaf pine (Pinus palustris)
 Giant sequoia (Sequoiadendron giganteum)
 Coast redwood (Sequoia sempervirens)
 Cork oak (Quercus suber)
 Niaouli (Melaleuca quinquenervia) which is extending in areas where bush fires are a mode of clearing (e.g. New Caledonia).
 Venus fly trap (Dionaea muscipula) – this grows low to the ground in acid marshes in North Carolina, and resists fires passing over due to being close to the moist soil; fire suppression threatens the species in its natural environment.
 White asphodel (Asphodelus albus)

For some species of pine, such as Aleppo pine (Pinus halepensis), European black pine (Pinus nigra) and lodgepole pine (Pinus contorta), the effects of fire can be antagonistic: if moderate, it helps pine cone bursting, seed dispersion and the cleaning of the underwoods; if intense, it destroys these resinous trees.

Active pyrophytes 
Some trees and shrubs such as the Eucalyptus of Australia actually encourage the spread of fires by producing inflammable oils, and are dependent on their resistance to the fire which keeps other species of tree from invading their habitat.

Pyrophile plants 
Other plants which need fire for their reproduction are called pyrophilic. Longleaf pine (Pinus palustris) is a pyrophile, depending on fire to clear the ground for seed germination.

The passage of fire, by increasing temperature and releasing smoke, is necessary to raise seeds dormancy of pyrophile plants such as Cistus and Byblis an Australian passive carnivorous plant.

Imperata cylindrica  is a plant of Papua New Guinea. Even green, it ignites easily and causes fires on the hills.

See also  
 Fire ecology
 Serotiny

References 

Plant physiology